The Coupe de la Ligue Final 1998 was a football match held at Stade de France, Saint-Denis on 4 April 1998, that saw Paris Saint-Germain defeat FC Girondins de Bordeaux in a penalty shootout

Match details

External links
Report on LFP official site

1998
Paris Saint-Germain F.C. matches
FC Girondins de Bordeaux matches
Association football penalty shoot-outs
1997–98 in French football
April 1998 sports events in Europe
Sport in Saint-Denis, Seine-Saint-Denis
Football competitions in Paris
1998 in Paris